Butyl iodide (1-iodobutane) is an organic compound which is an iodo derivative of butane.  It is used as an alkylating agent.

Isomer 

The compound isobutyl iodide AKA 1-iodo-2-methylpropane is isomeric to butyl iodide.

References

Alkylating agents
Iodoalkanes